Bibb is a surname of English origin. At the time of the British Census of 1881, its relative frequency was highest in Warwickshire (12.2 times the British average), followed by Worcestershire, Staffordshire, Dunbartonshire, London and Northamptonshire. In all other British counties, its relative frequency was below national average. The name Bibb may refer to:

 Chris Bibb, British rugby league footballer
 David Bibb, American civil servant
 Eric Bibb (born 1951), American blues musician
 Emmanuel Bibb, American streetball player 
 George M. Bibb (1776–1859), American politician
 Henry Bibb (1815-1854), American abolitionist
 Kyle Bibb (born 1988), English rugby league player 
 Leon Bibb (born 1944), American broadcaster
 Leon Bibb (musician) (born 1922), American folk singer and actor
 Leslie Bibb (born 1974), American actress
 Thomas Bibb (1783–1839), American politician
 William W. Bibb (1781–1820), American politician

See also
Bibb (disambiguation)

Surnames